The 2021–22 Philadelphia 76ers season was the 73rd season for the franchise in the National Basketball Association (NBA). 

The season was marred by controversy as All-Star guard Ben Simmons demanded to be traded due to his refusal to play for the team, and had missed training camp to enforce his holdout. The 76ers fined Simmons for conduct detrimental to the team and would continue to do so throughout the season. This led to Simmons being the most fined player in NBA history, with reports suggesting he had lost more than $10 million by the end of 2021.

On February 10, 2022, Simmons, along with Seth Curry, Andre Drummond, and draft picks, were traded to the Brooklyn Nets in exchange for All-Star guard James Harden and Paul Millsap.

On April 3, after a win over the Cleveland Cavaliers, the Sixers clinched their fifth consecutive playoff appearance.

The Sixers defeated the Toronto Raptors in the first round in six games and avenged their second round loss to them in 2019. They faced the Miami Heat in the second round where they lost in six games.

Draft picks

The Sixers initially carried one first-round pick and two second-round pick in the draft. The 50th pick was given via New York by the Willy Hermagomez trade made in 2015.  It was reported that the 50th pick Filip Petrušev would not join the 2021–22 roster. Petrušev signed for Turkish team Anadolu Efes on August 17.

Roster

Standings

Atlantic division

Conference standings

Game log

Preseason

|-style="background:#fcc;"
| 1
| October 4
| @ Toronto
| 
| Andre Drummond (19)
| Andre Drummond (14)
| Shake Milton (5)
| Scotiabank Arena8,016
| 0–1
|-style="background:#cfc;"
| 2
| October 7
| Toronto
| 
| Georges Niang (16)
| Andre Drummond (7)
| Tyrese Maxey (5)
| Wells Fargo Center11,732
| 1–1
|-style="background:#cfc;"
| 3
| October 12
| Brooklyn
| 
| Furkan Korkmaz (27)
| Paul Reed (10)
| Andre Drummond (6)
| Wells Fargo Center14,522
| 2–1
|-style="background:#fcc;"
| 4
| October 15
| @ Detroit
| 
| Andre Drummond (17)
| Andre Drummond (7)
| Drummond, Henry, Joe, Maxey (3)
| Little Caesars Arena7,623
| 2–2

Regular season

|-style="background:#cfc;"
| 1
| October 20
| @ New Orleans
| 
| Embiid, Korkmaz (22)
| Tobias Harris (12)
| Embiid, Korkmaz, Maxey (5)
| Smoothie King Center12,845
| 1–0
|-style="background:#fcc;"
| 2
| October 22
| Brooklyn
| 
| Curry, Harris (23)
| Andre Drummond (10)
| Joel Embiid|Embiid, Harris (4)
| Wells Fargo Center20,367
| 1–1
|-style="background:#cfc;"
| 3
| October 24
| @ Oklahoma City
| 
| Seth Curry (28)
| Embiid, Harris (9)
| Joel Embiid (6)
| Paycom Center14,256
| 2–1
|-style="background:#fcc;"
| 4
| October 26
| @ New York
| 
| Tobias Harris (23)
| Drummond, Harris (9)
| Tobias Harris (9)
| 15,218
| 2–2
|-style="background:#cfc;"
| 5
| October 28
| Detroit
| 
| Joel Embiid (30)
| Joel Embiid (18)
| Tyrese Maxey (6)
| Wells Fargo Center20,017
| 3–2
|-style="background:#cfc;"
| 6
| October 30
| Atlanta
| 
| Tobias Harris (22)
| Tobias Harris (11)
| Tobias Harris (4)
| Wells Fargo Center20,031
| 4–2

|-style="background:#cfc;"
| 7
| November 1
| Portland
| 
| Seth Curry (23)
| Andre Drummond (15)
| Drummond, Maxey (7)
| Wells Fargo Center20,115
| 5–2
|-style="background:#cfc;"
| 8
| November 3
| Chicago
| 
| Seth Curry (22)
| Joel Embiid (9)
| Joel Embiid (7)
| Wells Fargo Center20,438
| 6–2
|-style="background:#cfc;"
| 9
| November 4
| @ Detroit
| 
| Seth Curry (23)
| Embiid, Reed (9)
| Maxey, Milton (5)
| Little Caesars Arena8,702
| 7–2
|-style="background:#cfc;"
| 10
| November 6
| @ Chicago
| 
| Joel Embiid (30)
| Joel Embiid (15)
| Tyrese Maxey (8)
| United Center20,936
| 8–2
|-style="background:#fcc;"
| 11
| November 8
| New York
| 
| Furkan Korkmaz (19)
| Andre Drummond (25)
| Seth Curry (6)
| Wells Fargo Center20,224
| 8–3
|-style="background:#fcc;"
| 12
| November 9
| Milwaukee
| 
| Tyrese Maxey (31)
| Andre Drummond (20)
| Shake Milton (6)
| Wells Fargo Center20,029
| 8–4
|-style="background:#fcc;"
| 13
| November 11
| Toronto
| 
| Tyrese Maxey (33)
| Andre Drummond (12)
| Tobias Harris (7)
| Wells Fargo Center20,112
| 8–5
|-style="background:#fcc;"
| 14
| November 13
| @ Indiana
| 
| Tobias Harris (32)
| Andre Drummond (17)
| Seth Curry (5)
| Gainbridge Fieldhouse14,483
| 8–6
|-style="background:#fcc;"
| 15
| November 16
| @ Utah
| 
| Shake Milton (18)
| Isaiah Joe (8)
| Tobias Harris (5)
| Vivint Arena18,306
| 8–7
|-style="background:#cfc;"
| 16
| November 18
| @ Denver
| 
| Tyrese Maxey (22)
| Bassey, Harris (7)
| Seth Curry (5)
| Ball Arena14,547
| 9–7
|-style="background:#fcc;"
| 17
| November 20
| @ Portland
| 
| Harris, Maxey (28)
| Tobias Harris (8)
| Tyrese Maxey (8)
| Moda Center17,027
| 9–8
|-style="background:#cfc;"
| 18
| November 22
| @ Sacramento
| 
| Tyrese Maxey (24)
| Andre Drummond (23)
| Furkan Korkmaz (6)
| Golden 1 Center13,948
| 10–8
|-style="background:#fcc;"
| 19
| November 24
| @ Golden State
| 
| Seth Curry (24)
| Andre Drummond (12)
| Tyrese Maxey (5)
| Chase Center18,064
| 10–9
|-style="background:#fcc;"
| 20
| November 27
| Minnesota
| 
| Joel Embiid (42)
| Joel Embiid (14)
| Tyrese Maxey (9)
| Wells Fargo Center21,011
| 10–10
|-style="background:#cfc;"
| 21
| November 29
| Orlando
| 
| Seth Curry (24)
| Joel Embiid (13)
| Tyrese Maxey (9)
| Wells Fargo Center20,193
| 11–10

|-style="background:#fcc;"
| 22
| December 1
| @ Boston
| 
| Seth Curry (17)
| Joel Embiid (18)
| Curry, Embiid (6)
| TD Garden19,156
| 11–11
|-style="background:#cfc;"
| 23
| December 3
| @ Atlanta
| 
| Joel Embiid (28)
| Joel Embiid (12)
| Curry, Maxey (5)
| State Farm Arena17,092
| 12–11
|-style="background:#cfc;"
| 24
| December 6
| @ Charlotte
| 
| Joel Embiid (43)
| Joel Embiid (15)
| Joel Embiid (7)
| Spectrum Center14,462
| 13–11
|-style="background:#cfc;"
| 25
| December 8
| @ Charlotte
| 
| Joel Embiid (32)
| Joel Embiid (8)
| Seth Curry (8)
| Spectrum Center15,709
| 14–11
|-style="background:#fcc;"
| 26
| December 9
| Utah
| 
| Joel Embiid (19)
| Joel Embiid (9)
| Seth Curry (4)
| 20,272
| 14–12
|-style="background:#cfc;"
| 27
| December 11
| Golden State
| 
| Joel Embiid (26)
| Drummond, Embiid, Harris (9)
| Joel Embiid (4)
| Wells Fargo Center21,016
| 15–12
|-style="background:#fcc;"
| 28
| December 13
| @ Memphis
| 
| Tyrese Maxey (23)
| Charles Bassey (10)
| Tyrese Maxey (7)
| FedExForum13,420
| 15–13
|-style="background:#fcc;"
| 29
| December 15
| Miami
| 
| Tyrese Maxey (27)
| Joel Embiid (14)
| Embiid, Maxey, Milton (5)
| Wells Fargo Center20,389
| 15–14
|-style="background:#fcc;"
| 30
| December 16
| @ Brooklyn
| 
| Joel Embiid (32)
| Joel Embiid (9)
| Joel Embiid (6)
| Barclays Center17,053
| 15–15
|-style="background:#bbb;"
| —
| December 19
| New Orleans
| colspan="6"|Postponed (Makeup date: January 25)
|-style="background:#cfc;"
| 31
| December 20
| @ Boston
| 
| Joel Embiid (41)
| Joel Embiid (10)
| Seth Curry (7)
| TD Garden19,156
| 16–15
|-style="background:#fcc;"
| 32
| December 23
| Atlanta
| 
| Joel Embiid (23)
| Joel Embiid (10)
| Curry, Harris (5)
| Wells Fargo Center20,408
| 16–16
|-style="background:#cfc;"
| 33
| December 26
| 
| 
| Joel Embiid (36)
| Joel Embiid (13)
| Seth Curry (9)
| Capital One Arena16,767
| 17–16
|-style="background:#cfc;"
| 34
| December 28
| @ Toronto
| 
| Joel Embiid (36)
| Tobias Harris (12)
| Tobias Harris (10)
| Scotiabank Arena6,960
| 18–16
|-style="background:#cfc;"
| 35
| December 30
| @ Brooklyn
| 
| Joel Embiid (34)
| Andre Drummond (10)
| Curry, Harris (6)
| Barclays Center17,732
| 19–16

|-style="background:#cfc;"
| 36
| January 3
| Houston
| 
| Joel Embiid (31)
| Joel Embiid (15)
| Joel Embiid (10)
| Wells Fargo Center20,026
| 20–16
|-style="background:#cfc;"
| 37
| January 5
| @ Orlando
| 
| Joel Embiid (31)
| Tobias Harris (9)
| Seth Curry (12)
| Amway Center13,116
| 21–16
|-style="background:#cfc;"
| 38
| January 7
| San Antonio
| 
| Joel Embiid (31)
| Joel Embiid (12)
| Seth Curry|Curry, Embiid (7)
| Wells Fargo Center20,265
| 22–16
|-style="background:#cfc;"
| 39
| January 10
| @ Houston
| 
| Joel Embiid (31)
| Andre Drummond (11)
| Joel Embiid (6)
| Toyota Center13,593
| 23–16
|-style="background:#fcc;"
| 40
| January 12
| Charlotte
| 
| Joel Embiid (31)
| Drummond, Harris (8)
| Tobias Harris (5)
| Wells Fargo Center20,317
| 23–17
|-style="background:#cfc;"
| 41
| January 14
| Boston
| 
| Joel Embiid (25)
| Joel Embiid (13)
| Seth Curry (7)
| Wells Fargo Center20,444
| 24–17
|-style="background:#cfc;"
| 42
| January 15
| @ Miami
| 
| Joel Embiid (32)
| Joel Embiid (12)
| Seth Curry (5)
| FTX Arena19,600
| 25–17
|-style="background:#fcc;"
| 43
| January 17
| @ Washington
| 
| Joel Embiid (32)
| Charlie Brown Jr. (9)
| Seth Curry|Curry, Korkmaz (5)
| Capital One Arena14,581
| 25–18
|-style="background:#cfc;"
| 44
| January 19
| Orlando
| 
| Joel Embiid (50)
| Joel Embiid (12)
| Furkan Korkmaz (5)
| Wells Fargo Center20,081
| 26–18
|-style="background:#fcc;"
| 45
| January 21
| L.A. Clippers
| 
| Joel Embiid (40)
| Joel Embiid (13)
| Tyrese Maxey (8)
| Wells Fargo Center20,182
| 26–19
|-style="background:#cfc;"
| 46
| January 23
| @ San Antonio
| 
| Joel Embiid (38)
| Joel Embiid (12)
| Embiid, Maxey (6)
| AT&T Center16,437
| 27–19
|-style="background:#cfc;"
| 47
| January 25
| New Orleans
| 
| Joel Embiid (42)
| Joel Embiid (14)
| Georges Niang (6)
| Wells Fargo Center20,121
| 28–19
|-style="background:#cfc;"
| 48
| January 27
| L.A. Lakers
| 
| Joel Embiid (26)
| Andre Drummond (10)
| Tyrese Maxey (10)
| Wells Fargo Center20,953
| 29–19
|-style="background:#cfc;"
| 49
| January 29
| Sacramento
| 
| Joel Embiid (36)
| Joel Embiid (12)
| Tyrese Maxey (7)
| Wells Fargo Center20,380
| 30–19
|-style="background:#cfc;"
| 50
| January 31
| Memphis
| 
| Tyrese Maxey (33)
| Andre Drummond (23)
| Curry, Maxey (8)
| Wells Fargo Center20,424
| 31–19

|-style="background:#fcc;"
| 51
| February 2
| Washington
| 
| Joel Embiid (27)
| Joel Embiid (14)
| Tyrese Maxey (7)
| Wells Fargo Center20,089
| 31–20
|-style="background:#fcc;"
| 52
| February 4
| @ Dallas
| 
| Joel Embiid (27)
| Joel Embiid (13)
| Tyrese Maxey (6)
| American Airlines Center19,200
| 31–21
|-style="background:#cfc;"
| 53
| February 6
| @ Chicago
| 
| Joel Embiid (40)
| Joel Embiid (10)
| Tyrese Maxey (6)
| United Center20,233
| 32–21
|-style="background:#fcc;"
| 54
| February 8
| Phoenix
| 
| Joel Embiid (34)
| Joel Embiid (12)
| Andre Drummond (5)
| Wells Fargo Center20,720
| 32–22
|-style="background:#cfc;"
| 55
| February 11
| Oklahoma City
| 
| Joel Embiid (25)
| Joel Embiid (19)
| Embiid, Korkmaz (4)
| Wells Fargo Center20,669
| 33–22
|-style="background:#cfc;"
| 56
| February 12
| Cleveland
| 
| Joel Embiid (40)
| Joel Embiid (14)
| Joel Embiid (10)
| Wells Fargo Center21,057
| 34–22
|-style="background:#fcc;"
| 57
| February 15
| Boston
| 
| Joel Embiid (19)
| Joel Embiid (9)
| Joel Embiid (6)
| Wells Fargo Center20,960
| 34–23
|-style="background:#cfc;"
| 58
| February 17
| @ Milwaukee
| 
| Joel Embiid (42)
| Joel Embiid (14)
| Joel Embiid (5)
| Fiserv Forum17,341
| 35–23
|-style="background:#cfc;"
| 59
| February 25
| @ Minnesota
| 
| Joel Embiid (34)
| Joel Embiid (10)
| James Harden (12)
| Target Center16,684
| 36–23
|-style="background:#cfc;"
| 60
| February 27
| @ New York
| 
| Joel Embiid (37)
| James Harden (10)
| James Harden (16)
| Madison Square Garden19,812
| 37–23

|-style="background:#cfc;"
| 61
| March 2
| New York
| 
| Joel Embiid (27)
| Joel Embiid (12)
| James Harden (9)
| Wells Fargo Center21,333
| 38–23
|-style="background:#cfc;"
| 62
| March 4
| Cleveland
| 
| Tyrese Maxey (33)
| Joel Embiid (9)
| James Harden (11)
| Wells Fargo Center21,391
| 39–23
|-style="background:#fcc;"
| 63
| March 5
| @ Miami
| 
| Joel Embiid (22)
| Joel Embiid (15)
| Georges Niang (3)
| FTX Arena19,704
| 39–24
|-style="background:#cfc;"
| 64
| March 7
| Chicago
| 
| Joel Embiid (43)
| Joel Embiid (14)
| James Harden (14)
| Wells Fargo Center20,381
| 40–24
|-style="background:#fcc;"
| 65
| March 10
| Brooklyn
| 
| Joel Embiid (27)
| Joel Embiid (12)
| Harden, Milton (5)
| Wells Fargo Center21,408
| 40–25
|-style="background:#cfc;"
| 66
| March 13
| @ Orlando
| 
| Joel Embiid (35)
| Joel Embiid (16)
| Joel Embiid (7)
| Amway Center14,444
| 41–25
|-style="background:#fcc;"
| 67
| March 14
| Denver
| 
| Joel Embiid (34)
| Embiid, Harden (9)
| James Harden (11)
| Wells Fargo Center21,444
| 41–26
|-style="background:#cfc;"
| 68
| March 16
| @ Cleveland
| 
| Joel Embiid (35)
| Joel Embiid (17)
| James Harden (11)
| Rocket Mortgage FieldHouse19,432
| 42–26
|-style="background:#cfc;"
| 69
| March 18
| Dallas
| 
| Joel Embiid (32)
| Joel Embiid (8)
| James Harden (12)
| Wells Fargo Center21,428
| 43–26
|-style="background:#fcc;"
| 70
| March 20
| Toronto
| 
| Joel Embiid (21)
| Joel Embiid (13)
| James Harden (8)
| Wells Fargo Center21,180
| 43–27
|-style="background:#cfc;"
| 71
| March 21
| Miami
| 
| Tyrese Maxey (28)
| Harris, Jordan (8)
| Harris, Milton (6)
| Wells Fargo Center21,386
| 44–27
|-style="background:#cfc;"
| 72
| March 23
| @ L.A. Lakers
| 
| Joel Embiid (30)
| Joel Embiid (10)
| Harden, Maxey (7)
| Crypto.com Arena18,997
| 45–27
|-style="background:#cfc;"
| 73
| March 25
| @ L.A. Clippers
| 
| James Harden (29)
| James Harden (15)
| James Harden (7)
| Crypto.com Arena19,068
| 46–27
|-style="background:#fcc;"
| 74
| March 27
| @ Phoenix
| 
| Joel Embiid (37)
| Joel Embiid (15)
| James Harden (9)
| Footprint Center17,071
| 46–28
|-style="background:#fcc;"
| 75
| March 29
| Milwaukee
| 
| James Harden (32)
| Joel Embiid (14)
| James Harden (9)
| Wells Fargo Center21,467
| 46–29
|-style="background:#fcc;"
| 76
| March 31
| @ Detroit
| 
| Joel Embiid (37)
| Joel Embiid (15)
| James Harden (7)
| Little Caesars Arena20,023
| 46–30

|-style="background:#cfc;"
| 77
| April 2
| Charlotte
| 
| Joel Embiid (29)
| Joel Embiid (14)
| James Harden (13)
| Wells Fargo Center21,509
| 47–30
|-style="background:#cfc;"
| 78
| April 3
| @ Cleveland
| 
| Joel Embiid (47)
| Joel Embiid (17)
| James Harden (10)
| Rocket Mortgage FieldHouse19,432
| 48–30
|-style="background:#cfc;"
| 79
| April 5
| @ Indiana
| 
| Joel Embiid (45)
| Joel Embiid (13)
| James Harden (14)
| Gainbridge Fieldhouse15,583
| 49–30
|-style="background:#fcc;"
| 80
| April 7
| @ Toronto
| 
| Joel Embiid (30)
| Joel Embiid (10)
| James Harden (15)
| Scotiabank Arena19,800
| 49–31
|-style="background:#cfc;"
| 81
| April 9
| Indiana
|  
| Joel Embiid (41)
| Joel Embiid (20)
| James Harden (14)
| Wells Fargo Center21,171
| 50–31
|-style="background:#cfc;"
| 82
| April 10
| Detroit
| 
| Shake Milton (30)
| DeAndre Jordan (11)
| Tobias Harris (6)
| Wells Fargo Center21,459
| 51–31

Playoffs

|- style="background:#cfc;"
| 1
| April 16
| Toronto
| 
| Tyrese Maxey (38)
| Joel Embiid (15)
| James Harden (14)
| Wells Fargo Center20,610
| 1–0
|- style="background:#cfc;"
| 2
| April 18
| Toronto
| 
| Joel Embiid (31)
| Joel Embiid (11)
| Tyrese Maxey (8)
| Wells Fargo Center20,974
| 2–0
|- style="background:#cfc;"
| 3
| April 20
| @ Toronto
| 
| Joel Embiid (33)
| Joel Embiid (13)
| James Harden (10)
| Scotiabank Arena19,800
| 3–0
|- style="background:#fcc;"
| 4
| April 23
| @ Toronto
| 
| James Harden (22)
| Tobias Harris (11)
| James Harden (9)
| Scotiabank Arena19,800
| 3–1
|- style="background:#fcc;"
| 5
| April 25
| Toronto
| 
| Joel Embiid (20)
| Joel Embiid (11)
| James Harden (7)
| Wells Fargo Center20,517
| 3–2
|- style="background:#cfc;"
| 6
| April 28
| @ Toronto
| 
| Joel Embiid (33)
| Tobias Harris (11)
| James Harden (15)
| Scotiabank Arena19,800
| 4–2

|- style="background:#fcc;"
| 1
| May 2
| @ Miami
| 
| Tobias Harris (27)
| Harden, Reed (9)
| James Harden (5)
| FTX Arena19,620
| 0–1
|- style="background:#fcc;"
| 2
| May 4
| @ Miami
| 
| Tyrese Maxey (34)
| Furkan Korkmaz (6)
| James Harden (9)
| FTX Arena19,759
| 0–2
|- style="background:#cfc;"
| 3
| May 6
| Miami
| 
| Green, Maxey (21)
| Joel Embiid (11)
| Tobias Harris (8)
| Wells Fargo Center21,033
| 1–2
|- style="background:#cfc;"
| 4
| May 8
| Miami
| 
| James Harden (31)
| Joel Embiid (11)
| James Harden (9)
| Wells Fargo Center21,194
| 2–2
|- style="background:#fcc;"
| 5
| May 10
| @ Miami
| 
| Joel Embiid (17)
| Paul Reed (8)
| James Harden (4)
| FTX Arena19,868
| 2–3
|- style="background:#fcc;"
| 6
| May 12
| Miami
| 
| Embiid, Harden (20)
| Joel Embiid (12)
| James Harden (9)
| Wells Fargo Center21,082
| 2–4

Transactions

Trades

Free agency

Additions

References

Philadelphia 76ers seasons
Philadelphia 76ers
Philadelphia 76ers
Philadelphia 76ers